Captain Thunder may refer to:

Captain Thunder (film), 1930 starring Victor Varconi in the title role
Capitán Trueno, the hero of a series of Spanish comic books by Víctor Mora
Captain Thunder (DC Comics), an alternate version of Captain Marvel, as well as an early name for the character.

See also
Captain Thunderbolt